Sufers (Romansh: Sur) is a municipality in the Viamala Region in the Swiss canton of Graubünden.

History
Sufers is first mentioned in 831 as Subere.

Geography

Of this area, 13.4% is used for agricultural purposes, while 23.8% is forested. Of the rest of the land, 1.2% is settled (buildings or roads) and the remainder (61.6%) is non-productive (rivers, glaciers or mountains).

Before 2017, the municipality was located in the Rheinwald sub-district, of the Hinterrhein district, after 2017 it was part of the Viamala Region. It is a Haufendorf (an irregular, unplanned and quite closely packed village, built around a central square).

A dam on the Hinterrhein river was built in 1962 and forms the reservoir Sufnersee.

Demographics
, 3.1% of the population was made up of foreign nationals. Over the last 10 years the population has decreased at a rate of -6.6%.

, the gender distribution of the population was 52.0% male and 48.0% female. The age distribution, in Sufers is; 14 people or 12.2% of the population are between 0 and 9 years old. 11 people or 9.6% are 10 to 14, and 4 people or 3.5% are 15 to 19. Of the adult population, 11 people or 9.6% of the population are between 20 and 29 years old. 18 people or 15.7% are 30 to 39, 10 people or 8.7% are 40 to 49, and 17 people or 14.8% are 50 to 59. The senior population distribution is 12 people or 10.4% of the population are between 60 and 69 years old, 10 people or 8.7% are 70 to 79, there are 8 people or 7.0% who are 80 to 89.

In the 2007 federal election the most popular party was the SVP which received 57.3% of the vote. The next two most popular parties were the FDP (19.3%) and the CVP (2.1%).

In Sufers about 77.9% of the population (between age 25-64) have completed either non-mandatory upper secondary education or additional higher education (either university or a Fachhochschule).

Sufers has an unemployment rate of 0.29%. , there were 26 people employed in the primary economic sector and about 9 businesses involved in this sector. 12 people are employed in the secondary sector and there are 3 businesses in this sector. 27 people are employed in the tertiary sector, with 7 businesses in this sector.

The historical population is given in the following table:

Languages
Most of the population speaks German (91.3%), with Serbo-Croatian being second most common ( 4.3%) and Romansh being third ( 3.5%).

References

External links
 Official Web site (in German)
 

 
Municipalities of Graubünden